Robert Arnott is a medical archaeologist, who was sub-dean of medicine, director of the Centre for the History of Medicine (which he founded), and, unusually, director of the Institute of Medical Law in the University of Birmingham Medical School, until his forced early retirement in 2008. He was succeeded as director of the Centre for the History of Medicine by the medical historian Dr Jonathan Reinarz. He is also a visiting lecturer and module director for the Special Studies Programme in Ancient Medicine for the University of Oxford Medical School.

Robert Arnott was director of the Birmingham Medical Institute and regional sub-dean of the Royal Society of Medicine. He is also a vice-president of the Society for Ancient Medicine and a Fellow of the Royal Historical Society.

His research interests and most of his publications, which include three books and over sixty papers centre on disease and medicine in the Aegean and Anatolian Bronze Ages.

External links 
 

Living people
1951 births
British archaeologists
British Jews
People from Watford
Alumni of University College London